Ljungby may refer to:
Ljungby, city in Ljungby Municipality, Sweden
Ljungby Municipality, municipality in Kronoberg County, Sweden
Ljungby, Falkenberg, village and parish in Falkenberg Municipality, Sweden